Jani (also Romanized as Jānī; also known as Deh-e Jānī Meylak and Jani Saiyid) is a village in Jahanabad Rural District, in the Central District of Hirmand County, Sistan and Baluchestan Province, Iran. At the 2006 census, its population was 269, in 60 families.

References 

Populated places in Hirmand County